Crematogaster baduvi is a species of ant in tribe Crematogastrini. It was described by Forel in 1912.

References

baduvi
Insects described in 1912